TWA Flight 800 conspiracy theories are discredited alternative explanations of the crash of Trans World Airlines Flight 800 (TWA 800) in 1996. The NTSB found that the probable cause of the crash of TWA Flight 800 was an explosion of flammable fuel/air vapors in a fuel tank, most likely from a short circuit. Conspiracy theories claim that the crash was due to a U.S. Navy missile test gone awry, a terrorist missile strike, or an on-board bomb. In 2013, a documentary alleging that the investigation into the crash was a cover-up made news headlines with statements from six members of the original investigation team, now retired, who also filed a petition to reopen the probe.

Background
TWA 800, a Boeing 747-131, was a scheduled international passenger flight from New York City, New York to Rome, Italy, with a stopover in Paris, France. At about 20:31 EDT, on July 17, 1996, about 12 minutes after takeoff from John F. Kennedy International Airport (JFK), TWA 800 exploded and then crashed into the Atlantic Ocean near East Moriches, New York. Of the 230 passengers and crew on board, no survivors were found, making TWA 800 the second-deadliest aircraft accident in the United States at that time.

While investigators from the NTSB arrived on scene the following day, many witnesses to the accident had seen a "streak of light" that was usually described as ascending, moving to a point where a large fireball appeared. There was intense public interest in these witness reports and much speculation that the reported streak of light was from a missile that had struck TWA 800, causing the airplane to explode. Consequently, the Federal Bureau of Investigation (FBI) initiated a parallel criminal investigation alongside the NTSB's accident investigation.

Search and recovery
Pieces of the airplane wreckage were discovered floating on and beneath the surface of the Atlantic Ocean about eight miles south of East Moriches, New York. The main wreckage was found scattered on the ocean floor in an area about 4 miles long by  miles wide. In one of the largest diver-assisted salvage operations ever conducted, over 95 percent of the airplane wreckage was eventually recovered. Recovered wreckage was transported by boat to shore and then by truck to leased hangar space at the former Grumman Aircraft facility in Calverton, New York, for storage, examination, and reconstruction.

Aspects of conspiracy theories

Explosive residues
As wreckage was recovered, preliminary testing indicated the presence of explosive residue on three samples of material from three separate locations of the recovered airplane wreckage (described by the FBI as a piece of canvas-like material and two pieces of a floor panel). These samples were submitted to the FBI's laboratory in Washington, D.C., which determined that one sample contained traces of cyclotrimethylenetrinitramine (RDX), another nitroglycerin, and the third a combination of RDX and pentaerythritol tetranitrate (PETN); these findings received much media attention at the time. While investigators from the FBI viewed these positive tests as strong indications of a criminal act, the NTSB was more cautious, noting the lack of any patterns on the recovered wreckage characteristic of an explosion.

Ultimately, the NTSB was unable to determine the exact source of explosive residues found on the wreckage. Some of the possibilities considered were contamination from the aircraft's use in 1991 transporting troops during the Gulf War or its possible use in a dog-training explosive detection exercise about one month before the accident; however, the lack of any other corroborating evidence associated with a high-energy explosion led the NTSB to conclude that "the in-flight breakup of TWA flight 800 was not initiated by a bomb or missile strike".

Meanwhile, TWA chief 747 pilot Robert Terrell Stacey, who was participating in the official investigation as a TWA representative, became convinced that a reddish-brown substance observed on the backs of recovered passenger seats was suspicious, and possibly indicative of explosive residue or rocket fuel. Working with journalist James Sanders, and Sanders' wife Elizabeth, a TWA flight attendant, he removed items from the wreckage reconstruction site, specifically the samples of seat fabric as well as documents related to the investigation. In 1997 Sanders' published the book The Downing of TWA Flight 800, in which he proposed that TWA 800 had been downed by a missile, and that a government cover-up had taken place so as to not panic the public. Later, with the information provided by Sanders, the Riverside Press-Enterprise published a series of articles alleging that the substance was consistent with unexpended rocket fuel from a missile that struck TWA 800.

The NTSB determined the locations and appearance of the substance found on the seatbacks was consistent with adhesive used in the construction of the seats, and additional laboratory testing by NASA identified the substance as being consistent with those adhesives (results which Sanders disputed).

On December 5, 1997, federal prosecutors charged Sanders, his wife Elizabeth, and Stacey with theft of government property. The Sanders' defense attorney Bruce Maffeo described the prosecution as "extremely vindictive" and insisted that the couple had a First Amendment right to take the sample and crash-related documents to expose a cover-up. In April 1999, both were convicted of stealing evidence from civil aircraft wreckage, and were sentenced to probation (Stacey had previously pleaded guilty to a misdemeanor in the case).  In 1999, James Sanders authored a second book, Altered Evidence.

Radar data

Unidentified radar tracks
One of the first widely reported criticisms of the official investigation was by former reporter Pierre Salinger, who held a press conference in Cannes, France, on November 7, 1996. He stated he had proof that TWA 800 was shot down by friendly fire, and the incident was being covered up by the government. Salinger said "he was basing the claims on information he saw in a document given to him six weeks ago by someone in French Intelligence with close contacts to U.S. officials", but refused to name his source. CNN quickly found Salinger's document to be "a widely accessible e-mail letter that has been circulating for at least six weeks on the Internet's World Wide Web." Salinger's evidence was actually an e-mail from Richard Russell, a retired airline pilot.

Salinger's previous position as White House Press Secretary, as well as longtime correspondent for ABC News, initially gave credence to his statements, transforming them from "internet conspiracies" into the mainstream. However, under scrutiny, his allegations, and the reports issued with his collaborators, became the subject of much criticism in the media. NTSB Vice chairman Bob Francis was quoted as saying "He was an idiot, he didn't know what he was talking about, and he was totally irresponsible."

TWA 800 flightpath after explosion

Ray Lahr
Another proponent of the U.S. Navy shootdown theory and prominent critic of the zoom climb scenario was H. Ray Lahr, a retired United Airlines pilot. Lahr, recipient of the Laura Taber Barbour Air Safety Award by the Flight Safety Foundation in 1994, filed a Freedom of Information Act (FOIA) suit in U.S. District Court, Central District of California, Western Division, on November 6, 2003, against the NTSB and CIA. Lahr sought documentation and data denied to him through previous FOIA requests that the NTSB and CIA used for their calculations of the zoom climb, which was used to produce the CIA animation. When asked for his reasons for seeking these documents, Lahr stated "I believe that I could show that the zoom climb never happened. If the zoom climb never happened then they've got to find out what the eyewitnesses saw and the only logical conclusion there is that they saw a missile."

On August 31, 2006, the District Court issued an initial ruling that the evidence submitted by Lahr as justification for his FOIA lawsuit was "sufficient for the plaintiff to proceed based on his claim that the government acted improperly," and that Lahr should be granted access to some, but not all, of the documents he was seeking, based on the FOIA statutes and case law. In a further ruling on October 4, 2006, the court finalized the list of documents that the NTSB and CIA must provide to Lahr (again granting some, but not all, of his FOIA requests). While the court reaffirmed its previous ruling that Lahr had provided proof "sufficient to suggest that the government acted improperly", it also clarified that this "conclusion is based on a characterization of the evidence in a light most favorable to the plaintiff, but does not reflect or constitute any finding by the court."
Upon being handed this verdict by the court, the agencies involved claimed the documents had been "lost" and could not be located, according to the plaintiff.

Bolide strike
A theory was posited in 1997 by Michael Davis, an American amateur geologist, that a bolide exploded near the airplane. A bolide is a large meteoroid, explosively torn apart as it hits the atmosphere. Davis proposed that the mysterious streak observed just before the explosion was the meteoroid's entry path, moments before it blew apart. At least one of the resulting pieces of the exploding meteoroid could have penetrated the fuselage and ripped through the almost empty central wing tank, destroying the wing's structural integrity before exiting the other side. "The damage to the CWT seems to start at the center and work its way forward along a discernible path. A fuel explosion would radiate damage in all directions." The vapor in the fuel tank could have ignited due to the searing heat produced by the bolide's high velocity. Other data appear to fit the hypothesis; the sequence of multiple sonic booms heard by witnesses onshore could be explained by the explosion and subsequent scattering of the heavier bolide remnants; the estimated 200 holes in the fuselage (cited in FBI report) could be indicative of metal cut by objects traveling at extremely high speed.

Although raising an interesting possibility, other scientists dismissed this theory due to the extremely low probability of a bolide's intersecting the aircraft's flight path at precisely the required moment.

Electromagnetic interference
On April 9, 1998, Elaine Scarry's article in The New York Review of Books, titled "The Fall of TWA 800:
The Possibility of Electromagnetic Interference", was published. Scarry, a professor of English and American Literature and Language at Harvard, proposed that electromagnetic interference, also referred to as "High Intensity Radiated Fields" (HIRF), could have been the cause of the TWA 800 crash, specifically energy emitted from a U.S. military craft. Later that year, The New York Review of Books published a series of letters between Scarry and NTSB Chairman James Hall discussing the possibility of HIRF being causal to the accident, and what steps the NTSB was taking in its investigation to determine if it was a factor.

After the adoption of the final report, Scarry published another article in the New York Review of Books titled "TWA 800 and Electromagnetic Interference: Work Already Completed and Work that Still Needs to be Done". While praising the initial research done by the NTSB into HIRFs, she also stated that much more additional research was needed. Scarry criticized what she felt was a bias in the investigation to the "meticulous" detailing of events inside the airplane, while not fully exploring the electromagnetic environment outside the airplane. Scarry focused on a U.S. Navy P-3 Orion close to TWA 800 as being a possible source of electromagnetic interference and cause of the CWT explosion on TWA 800.

Scarry has since written about Swissair Flight 111 and EgyptAir Flight 990 crashes in connection with electromagnetic radiation.

Dissenting views from the investigation

IAMAW
As an invited party to the NTSB investigation, the International Association of Machinists and Aerospace Workers (IAMAW) submitted a report into the public docket. In this report the IAMAW disputed the NTSB's sequencing study, and proposed a breakup sequence that started on the lower left side of the airplane, when a high-pressure event "unzipped" the fuselage. The IAMAW wrote that "a major event may have occurred on the left side of the aircraft. It could have contributed to or been the cause of the destruction of Flight 800." and that "the CWT exploded, but as a result of the airplane's breakup, and was not the initial event."

The IAMAW criticized the accuracy of the "Tag database" used to document the recovered wreckage and the reliability of the witness statements. The IAMAW strongly criticized the FBI's conduct during the investigation, including the undocumented removal by FBI agents of wreckage from the hangar where it was stored. However, they also commended the NTSB staff, management and board members for their cooperation during the investigation, and stated that "The fact the media has put and other groups continue to bring pressure on the board, we find it very comforting that the focus was not changed due to these forces." They concluded that "The causes and circumstances that contributed directly to the accident are unknown."

William Donaldson

William S. Donaldson, a retired Naval officer, formed the Associated Retired Aviation Professionals (ARAP) to investigate the TWA 800 crash. He authored the "Interim Report on the Crash of TWA Flight 800 and the Actions of the NTSB and the FBI" (the "Donaldson Report"), which was released on July 17, 1998, two years before the NTSB's Final Report. In it, Donaldson stated that TWA 800 was struck by two missiles, fired from the water, most likely as a terrorist attack, and subsequently the FBI and NTSB conspired to cover up this fact due to political pressure.

Donaldson disputed the CWT fuel-air vapor explosion scenario, stating that "In the history of aviation, there has never been an in-flight explosion in any Boeing airliner of a Jet-A kerosene fuel vapor/air mixture in any tank, caused by mechanical failure." Eyewitness, debris field, metallurgical, and victim injury evidence were all cited by Donaldson as proof of the missile-attack scenario. Donaldson acknowledged James Sanders' theory of an accidental shoot-down, and did not rule out U.S. Navy involvement; however, he viewed circumstantial evidence of a terrorist attack "more compelling".

Much of the report dealt with Donaldson's assertions of a conspired cover-up by the FBI and NTSB, in co-operation with the Justice Department. Donaldson believed that the Clinton Administration wanted to hide the actual cause of the crash for political reasons, specifically the upcoming presidential elections. Donaldson concluded his report with the request that Congress hold Congressional hearings into the crash and/or request that the Justice Department appoint an Independent Counsel to investigate (neither of which happened).

Donaldson received support and funding from the advocacy group Accuracy in Media, which promoted his views. He died in 2001 of a brain tumor; the ARAP Web site is still active.

Public acceptance of conspiracy theories
As of 1998, only about half of Americans accepted the NTSB's conclusion that the crash was the result of a mechanical malfunction. According to the rhetorician Shane Miller, the widespread acceptance of conspiracy theories is a result of a lack of solid evidence of the direct cause of the source of ignition for the center fuel tank explosion. The heavy redaction of FBI interviews with witnesses also contributed to public doubt of official explanation.

Documentary
On July 17, 2013, the 17th anniversary of the tragedy, the Epix premium TV channel aired the documentary TWA Flight 800, directed by Kristina Borjesson, which alleges that the crash investigation was a cover-up. The film highlights extensive eyewitness interviews, with many interviewees directly objecting to publicly described versions of their own descriptions of events. It also highlights interviews with investigators who had been involved in the original inquest, six of whom had filed a petition to reopen the probe. Their petition was based on eyewitness accounts, radar evidence indicating a possible missile and claims of evidence tampering. They dubbed it "The TWA 800 Project". Former NTSB investigator Henry Hughes has been quoted that he believes a bomb or a missile caused the crash.

Litigation
On 19 September 2022, the families of 15 victims filed Krick et al v. Raytheon Corporation (case 1:22-cv-11032ck, U.S District Court of Massachusetts), alleging the cause of the flight's explosion was the testing of the Aegis Combat System. The lawsuit alleges that the defense system fired SM-2 missiles at aerial targets in close proximity to flight paths, resulting in a friendly fire accident. The lawsuit then alleges that the Dept. of Defense and the FBI covered up the incident.

See also
 Korean Air Lines Flight 007 (September 1983) alternative theories

References

Further reading

External links
 

Conspiracy theories involving aviation incidents
Aviation accident investigations with disputed causes
TWA Flight 800